Azhimukham is a 1972 Indian Malayalam film, directed by P. Vijayan. The film stars Jayabharathi, Cochin Haneefa, Bahadoor and K. P. Ummer in the lead roles. The film had musical score by M. S. Baburaj.

Cast
Jayabharathi
Cochin Haneefa
Bahadoor
K. P. Ummer
Nellikode Bhaskaran
Sujatha
T. K. Balachandran

Soundtrack
The music was composed by M. S. Baburaj and the lyrics were written by Mankombu Gopalakrishnan and Poochakkal Shahul Hameed.

References

External links
 

1972 films
1970s Malayalam-language films